The following is a list of notable deaths in November 2021.

Entries for each day are listed alphabetically by surname. A typical entry lists information in the following sequence:
 Name, age, country of citizenship at birth, subsequent country of citizenship (if applicable), reason for notability, cause of death (if known), and reference.

November 2021

1
Brian Adair, 86, Scottish sports administrator, president (1983) and chair (1986) of the Scottish Cricket Union.
Gulraiz Akhtar, 78, Pakistani field hockey player, Olympic champion (1968).
Giacomo Babini, 92, Italian Roman Catholic prelate, bishop of Pitigliano-Sovana-Orbetello (1991–1996) and Grosseto (1996–2001).
Aaron Beck, 100, American psychiatrist (cognitive therapy, Beck Depression Inventory), co-founder of the Beck Institute for Cognitive Behavior Therapy.
Emmett Chapman, 85, American jazz musician, inventor of the Chapman Stick.
Pundlik Hari Danve, 95, Indian politician, MP (1977–1979, 1989–1991).
Semra Dinçer, 56, Turkish actress (Elephants and Grass, Kavak Yelleri, Kuzey Güney), lung cancer.
Hugo Dittfach, 85, German-born Canadian jockey.
Temirkhan Dosmukhanbetov, 72, Kazakhstani politician, mayor of Astana (2003–2004) and MP (since 2012). (death announced on this date)
Nelson Freire, 77, Brazilian classical pianist.
Tori Geib, 35, American cancer patient advocate.
Jonathan Gledhill, 72, English Anglican prelate, bishop of Southampton (1996–2003) and Lichfield (2003–2015).
Gilberto Grácio, 85, Portuguese guitar maker.
Alan Igglesden, 57, English cricketer (Kent, Western Province, national team), brain cancer.
Yuri Klepikov, 86, Russian screenwriter (The Ascent, The Seventh Companion) and actor (The Beginning).
Denis Lapalme, 62, Canadian Paralympic swimmer (1976) and actor.
Jessie Lichauco, 109, Cuban-born American-Filipino philanthropist.
Princess Marie Alix of Schaumburg-Lippe, 98, German noblewoman, Duchess of Schleswig-Holstein (1965–1980).
Pat Martino, 77, American jazz guitarist and composer.
Poerio Mascella, 71, Italian footballer (Varese, Ternana, Pistoiese).
Bruno Moretti, 80, Australian athlete, Paralympic champion (1968).
Seeco Patterson, 90, Cuban-born Jamaican percussionist (Bob Marley and the Wailers).
Maurice Price, 83, Irish football player and coach.
Arvinder Singh Lovely, 56, Indian politician, Delhi MLA (2008–2013), heart attack.
Lawrence Donald Soens, 95, American Roman Catholic prelate, bishop of Sioux City (1983–1998).
William R. Spaulding, 97, American politician, member of the Council of the District of Columbia (1975–1987).
Bill Stern, 95, American botanist.

2
John Aiken, 89, American ice hockey player (Montreal Canadiens).
Cyrus Amouzgar, 87, Iranian politician, acting minister of intelligence and tourism (1978–1979).
Molana Azizullah Bohio, 75, Pakistani Islamic scholar and politician.
Jane Brown Grimes, 80, American Hall of Fame tennis executive, president of the USTA (2007–2008).
Rabiranjan Chattopadhyay, 81, Indian politician, West Bengal MLA (since 2011).
Flora D. Crittenden, 97, American educator and politician, member of the Virginia House of Delegates (1993–2004).
Ali Fadhul, 81, Ugandan military officer and convicted war criminal, chief of army staff (1979), complications from diabetes.
Sabah Fakhri, 88, Syrian tenor singer.
Des Ferguson, 91, Irish Gaelic footballer (Gaeil Colmcille, Dublin).
Federico Granja Ricalde, 79, Mexican politician, three-term deputy, mayor of Mérida (1976–1978), and governor of Yucatán (1994–1995).
Bettina Grossman, 94, American conceptual artist.
Kenneth Holmes, 86, British molecular biologist.
Irene Lalji, Surinamese lawyer and television presenter, COVID-19.
Tomas Leandersson, 55, Swedish Hall of Fame ten-pin bowler.
Clive Lee, 82, British design engineer (Exeter hip).
Carlos Lélis, 90, Portuguese politician, MP.
Li Zehou, 91, Chinese philosopher and political activist.
Paul A. Libby, 100, American fluid dynamicist and academic.
Tshitenge Lubabu, 66, Congolese journalist and writer.
Sir Alistair MacFarlane, 90, Scottish electrical engineer and academic administrator, principal of Heriot-Watt University (1989–1996).
John Marshall, 76, American football player (San Francisco 49ers, Seattle Seahawks, Green Bay Packers).
Tom Matte, 82, American football player (Baltimore Colts), Super Bowl champion (1971).
Alf Mayer, 83, Canadian Olympic sports shooter (1968, 1972).
Gerard V. Middleton, 90, Canadian geologist.
Dennis Moore, 75, American politician and lawyer, member of the U.S. House of Representatives (1999–2011), cancer.
Hamdullah Mukhlis, Afghan military officer, bombing.
Declan Mulligan, 83, Irish-born American rock musician (The Beau Brummels).
Ed Nickla, 88, American football player (Chicago Bears, Montreal Alouettes, Toronto Argonauts), CFL East All-Star (1962, 1963).
Hiroshi Ogawa, 72, Japanese politician, governor of Fukuoka Prefecture (2011–2021), lung cancer.
John Joe O'Hagan, 91, Irish Gaelic footballer (Clonoe O'Rahilly's).
Alf Patrick, 100, English footballer (York City).
Jacques Pimpaneau, 87, French sinologist.
Luciano Piquè, 86, Italian footballer (Udinese, Genoa, Entella).
Viktor Putyatin, 80, Ukrainian fencer, Olympic silver medalist (1968, 1972).
Ruby Richman, 87, Canadian Olympic basketball player (1964).
Mohamed Soukhane, 90, Algerian footballer (Le Havre, national team).
Neal Smith, 101, American politician, member of the U.S. House of Representatives (1959–1995).
Patricija Šulin, 55, Slovenian politician, MEP (2014–2019).
Abhay Vakil, 71, Indian billionaire businessman.
Ernest Wilson, 69, Jamaican reggae singer (The Clarendonians).

3
Hassan Al Alfi, 85, Egyptian politician, minister of interior (1993–1997).
Eileen Anderson, 93, American politician, mayor of Honolulu (1981–1985).
Bob Baker, 82, British screenwriter (Wallace and Gromit, Doctor Who, K-9).
François Blank, 90, Swiss Olympic ice hockey player (1952).
Joanna Bruzdowicz, 78, Polish composer.
Wilma Chan, 72, American politician, member of the Alameda County Board of Supervisors (1995–2000, since 2011) and the California State Assembly (2000–2006), traffic collision.
Georgie Dann, 81, French singer, complications from surgery.
Anne Emerman, 84, American disability rights activist, pneumonia.
Pablo Armando Fernández, 91, Cuban poet and novelist.
Hermann Haverkamp, 79, German Olympic water polo player (1968, 1972).
Yasuro Kikuchi, 92, Japanese Go player.
Helga Lindner, 70, German swimmer, Olympic silver medalist (1968).
Michael Marai, 73, Papua New Guinean Roman Catholic prelate, bishop of Goroka (1988–1994).
Abdul Muhib Mazumder, 89, Indian politician, Assam MLA (1983–1991, 1996–2001, 2011–2016).
Víctor Manuel Ortiz, 56, Puerto Rican politician, mayor of Gurabo (2005–2016).
Jean Pierson, 80, Tunisian-born French engineer.
Warren Powers, 80, American football player (Oakland Raiders) and coach (Missouri Tigers, Washington State Cougars).
Andrei Redkous, 64, Russian footballer (Zenit, Torpedo Moscow, Torpedo Vladimir).
Cecilia Robinson, 97, English cricketer (Kent, national team).
Boris Sádecký, 24, Slovak ice hockey player (HK Orange 20, HC Slovan Bratislava, Bratislava Capitals), cardiac arrest.
Sharon Smith Kane, 89, American cartoonist, illustrator and children's author.
Tang Yao-ming, 80, Taiwanese military officer, minister of national defense (2002–2004) and chief of the general staff (1999–2002).
Kurt Thyboe, 81, Danish journalist and sports commentator, pneumonia.
Eric Franklin Wood, 74, Canadian-American hydrologist, cancer.

4
Vanessa Angel, 27, Indonesian actress, traffic collision.
Sir Brian Bender, 72, British civil servant.
Lionel Blair, 92, Canadian-born British actor (The Limping Man, A Hard Day's Night), choreographer and television presenter (Give Us a Clue).
Barbara-Rose Collins, 82, American politician, member of the Detroit City Council (1982–1991, 2001–2009) and the U.S. House of Representatives (1991–1997), COVID-19.
Herman LeRoy Emmet, 78, American photojournalist and visual artist, complications of Parkinson's disease.
Amela Fetahović, 35, Bosnian footballer (Sarajevo, Spartak Subotica, national team).
Aaron Feuerstein, 95, American industrialist and philanthropist, CEO of Malden Mills.
Ibedul Gibbons, 77, Palauan activist.
Francis Huré, 105, French World War II Resistance member, diplomat, and writer.
Károly Király, 91, Romanian politician, senator (1990–1992).
Heorhiy Kryuchkov, 92, Ukrainian politician, deputy (1998–2006).
Mario Lavista, 78, Mexican composer and writer.
Amatsia Levkovich, 83, Israeli footballer (Hapoel Tel Aviv, national team).
June Lindsey, 99, British-Canadian biochemist.
Ruth Ann Minner, 86, American politician, member of the Delaware House of Representatives (1975–1983) and Senate (1983–1993), governor of Delaware (2001–2009).
Subrata Mukherjee, 75, Indian politician, West Bengal MLA (1971–1977, 1982–1991, 1996–2006, since 2011) and mayor of Kolkata (2000–2005), heart attack.
Eugenio Pazzaglia, 72, Italian footballer (Pisa, Civitavecchia, Siena).
Mike Pitts, 61, American football player (Philadelphia Eagles, Atlanta Falcons, New England Patriots).
Devwrat Singh, 52, Indian politician, Chhattisgarh MLA (1998–2008, since 2018) and MP (2007–2009), heart attack.
Thein Aung, 56, Burmese businessman, CFO of Mytel, shot.
Jack Vitty, 98, English footballer (Workington, Brighton & Hove Albion).
Ian Wallace, 87, British ornithologist.
Claude Nelson Warren, 89, American anthropologist.
Roger Zatkoff, 90, American football player (Green Bay Packers, Detroit Lions).

5
Charles Brackeen, 81, American jazz saxophonist.
James A. Brundage, 92, American historian.
Walter Brune, 95, German architect.
Charlie Burns, 85, American-born Canadian ice hockey player (Minnesota North Stars, Boston Bruins, Pittsburgh Penguins), world champion (1958).
Bob Dollin, 92, Australian politician, Queensland MLA (1989–1998).
Russell Ebert, 72, Australian football player (Port Adelaide, North Melbourne) and coach, leukaemia.
Lizzie Emeh, 44, British artist and songwriter.
Ryszard Grzegorczyk, 82, Polish footballer (Polonia Bytom, Lens, national team).
Erich Isaac, 93, German-born Israeli Lehi militant and geographer.
Mei Jones, 68, Welsh scriptwriter and actor (C'mon Midffîld!). (death announced on this date)
Robert S. Kiss, 63, American politician, member (1989–2007) and speaker (1997–2007) of the West Virginia House of Delegates, cancer.
Andris Kolbergs, 82, Latvian writer and screenwriter (Defenders of Riga).
Norman Macfarlane, Baron Macfarlane of Bearsden, 95, Scottish industrialist and life peer, member of the House of Lords (1991–2016).
Luigi Maldera, 75, Italian footballer (Monza, Milan, Catanzaro).
Marília Mendonça, 26, Brazilian singer, Grammy winner (2019), airplane crash.
Vidadi Muradov, 65, Azerbaijani carpet specialist and academic.
Palakkeezh Narayanan, 81, Indian writer, academic and political activist.
Nguon Nhel, 78, Cambodian politician, minister of agriculture (1989–1993) and MP (since 1993).
Beldina Odenyo Onassis, 31, Kenyan-British musician.
Dušan Pašek, 36, Slovak ice hockey player (HC Slovan Bratislava, HC Košice, ŠHK 37 Piešťany), suicide by hanging.
Jerome Schutzer, 91, American politician, member of the New York State Assembly (1961–1965) and Senate (1966).
Khawaja Muhammad Sharif, 71, Pakistani jurist, justice (1998–2009) and chief justice (2009–2010) of Lahore High Court.
Siluyan, 82, Russian Orthodox Old-Rite prelate, bishop of Novosibirsk (since 2015).
Flip Stapper, 76, Dutch footballer (FC Twente, AZ Alkmaar).
Ross Tolleson, 65, American politician, member of the Georgia State Senate (2003–2015).
Paul Torcello, 67, Italian-born Australian advertising photographer.
Kinji Yoshimoto, 55, Japanese animator, writer and director (Megazone 23, Plastic Little, Queen's Blade).

6
Keld Andersen, 75, Danish Olympic handball player (1972), cancer.
Peter Aykroyd, 65, Canadian comedian (Saturday Night Live) and actor (Coneheads, Nothing but Trouble), sepsis.
László Bélády, 93, Hungarian-American computer scientist, dementia.
Maureen Cleave, 87, British journalist, conducted John Lennon's "more popular than Jesus" interview.
Kambiz Derambakhsh, 79, Iranian graphic designer, COVID-19.
Edward Fender, 79, Polish Olympic luger (1964).
Jim Kerray, 85, Scottish footballer (Raith Rovers, Stirling Albion, St Johnstone).
Pavol Molnár, 85, Slovak footballer, 1962 FIFA World Cup silver medalist, 1960 European Nations' Cup bronze medalist.
Angelo Mosca, 84, American Hall of Fame football player (Hamilton Tiger-Cats, Ottawa Rough Riders) and professional wrestler (NWA).
Shawn Rhoden, 46, Jamaican-American professional bodybuilder, Mr. Olympia (2018), heart attack.
Raúl Rivero, 75, Cuban poet, cancer.
Marinko Rokvić, 67, Serbian folk singer, pancreatic cancer.
Clifford Rose, 92, British actor (Tell Me Lies, Work Is a Four-Letter Word, Pirates of the Caribbean: On Stranger Tides).
Erich Saling, 96, German gynaecologist, pioneer of maternal–fetal medicine.
Luíz Antônio dos Santos, 57, Brazilian Olympic long-distance runner (1996), cardiac arrest.
Cissé Mariam Kaïdama Sidibé, 73, Malian politician, prime minister (2011–2012).
Tarak Sinha, 70, Indian cricket coach, lung cancer.
Harvey White, 83, American football player (Boston Patriots).
Muamer Zukorlić, 51, Serbian politician and Islamic cleric, member (2016–2020) and vice-president (since 2020) of the National Assembly, co-founder of BANU, heart attack.
Yukhym Zvyahilsky, 88, Ukrainian politician, mayor of Donetsk (1992–1993), acting prime minister (1993–1994), and deputy (1990–2019), COVID-19.

7
Ian Adams, 84, Canadian author (S: Portrait of a Spy) and playwright, stroke.
Alarm, 20, South Korean Overwatch player. (death announced on this date)
Peter Hamilton Bailey, 94, Australian public servant and academic.
Liudmila Belavenets, 81, Russian chess player, COVID-19.
Sir John Butterfill, 80, British politician, MP (1983–2010).
Hasan Čengić, 64, Bosnian politician, MP (1998–2002) and president of the parliament of the Islamic Community (2015–2019).
Frank Coad, 91, Australian racing driver.
James F. Fries, 83, American rheumatologist and author, complications from a stroke.
Sunit Ghosh, 87, Indian cricket umpire.
Sir James Gobbo, 90, Australian judge, governor of Victoria (1997–2000).
Robin Greiner, 89, American Olympic pair skater (1956).
Carmel Holmes, 75, Australian politician, Tasmania MHA (1984–1986).
Barry Jackson, 83, English footballer (York City).
Aliya Khambikova, 21, Russian volleyball player.
Béla Kovács, 84, Hungarian clarinetist.
Carmen Laffón, 87, Spanish painter and sculptor.
Jacques Limouzy, 95, French politician, deputy (1967–1969, 1973–1981, 1986–2002).
Bopol Mansiamina, 72, Congolese musician (Les Quatre Étoiles), stroke.
Vadim Morozov, 67, Russian politician and writer, minister of railways (2003–2004), COVID-19.
Igor Nikulin, 61, Russian hammer thrower, Olympic bronze medallist (1992).
Jai Narayan Poonia, 87, Indian politician, Rajasthan MLA (1977–1980, 1985–1990), cardiac arrest.
Brian Renwood, 86, Australian footballer (Collingwood).
Enrique Rocha, 81, Mexican actor (Satánico pandemonium, Yo compro esa mujer, El Privilegio de Amar).
Pappu Sain, 95, Pakistani dhol player, liver cancer.
Sergei Shmatko, 55, Russian politician, minister of energy (2008–2012), COVID-19.
Zena Stein, 99, South African epidemiologist.
Dean Stockwell, 85, American actor (Quantum Leap, Married to the Mob, Paris, Texas).
John Tabinaman, 69, Papua New Guinean politician, vice-president (2007–2009) and acting president (2008–2009) of the Autonomous Region of Bougainville.
Bas van der Vlies, 79, Dutch politician, member of the Second Chamber (1981–2010) and leader of the Reformed Political Party (1986–2010), cancer.
John White, 97, British art historian.
Ronnie Williams, 59, American basketball player (Florida Gators, Tampa Bay Thrillers, Mississippi Jets), brain cancer.

8
Amalia Aguilar, 97, Cuban-born Mexican actress (Ritmos del Caribe, Al son del mambo, Amor perdido) and dancer.
Rinus Bennaars, 90, Dutch footballer (DOSKO, Feyenoord, national team).
Keith Bradshaw, 58, Australian cricket player (Tasmania) and administrator, multiple myeloma.
Annette Chalut, 97, French World War II Resistance member.
Abdul Wahab Dalimunthe, 82, Indonesian politician, MP (2009–2014, since 2017).
Medina Dixon, 59, American basketball player (Old Dominion Lady Monarchs), Olympic bronze medalist (1992), pancreatic cancer.
Pedro Feliciano, 45, Puerto Rican baseball player (New York Mets, Fukuoka Daiei Hawks).
Seán FitzPatrick, 73, Irish businessman (Anglo Irish Bank hidden loans controversy), cardiac arrest.
Abdoulkarim Goukoye, 57, Nigerien militant and politician, spokesperson of the CSRD (2010–2011).
Margo Guryan, 84, American singer-songwriter ("Sunday Mornin'").
Mike Harris, 82, South African racing driver (Formula One).
Kazuko Hosoki, 83, Japanese fortune teller and writer, respiratory failure.
Stu Kennedy, 90, Canadian football player (Ottawa Rough Riders).
Desiet Kidane, 21, Eritrean racing cyclist, traffic collision.
Kirsi Kunnas, 96, Finnish children's author.
Odd F. Lindberg, 76, Norwegian journalist and seal inspector.
Sylvère Lotringer, 83, French literary critic and cultural theorist, founder of Semiotext(e).
Mahlagha Mallah, 104, Iranian environmentalist, founder of the Women's Society Against Environmental Pollution.
Ahad Miah, 65, Bangladeshi politician, MP (1988–1991).
Gennady Muravin, 90, Russian-Finnish translator and journalist.
Wilhelm Schraml, 86, German Roman Catholic prelate, auxiliary bishop of Regensburg (1986–2001) and bishop of Passau (2001–2012).
Franz Streitwieser, 82, German-born American trumpet player, complications from Alzheimer's disease.
Chittaranjan Das Thakur, Indian politician, West Bengal MLA (1996–2011).
Muhammad Zada, 32, Pakistani anti-drug activist and blogger, shot.
Peter Zimroth, 78, American attorney.

9
John Bean, 94, British political activist and writer.
Jamshid Behnam, 93, Iranian sociologist.
Mariano Castillo Alcalá, 73, Spanish politician, mayor of Villacañas (1983–1987) and member of the Cortes of Castilla–La Mancha (1987–1991).
Gela Charkviani, 82, Georgian diplomat.
Max Cleland, 79, American politician, senator (1997–2003), administrator of veterans affairs (1977–1981), and Georgia secretary of state (1983–1996).
Austin Currie, 82, Irish civil rights activist and politician, TD (1989–2002) and minister of state for justice (1994–1997).
Jerry Douglas, 88, American actor (The Young and the Restless).
Erika Fisch, 87, German runner and Olympic long jumper (1956).
Willis Forko, 37, Liberian-American footballer (Real Salt Lake, Bodø/Glimt, national team).
Bob Gill, 90, American illustrator and graphic designer.
Larry Gordon, 76, American musician, injuries sustained in traffic collision.
Loucif Hamani, 71, Algerian Olympic boxer (1972).
Dianne Hamilton, 87, American politician, member of the New Mexico House of Representatives (1999–2017).
Roy Holder, 75, English actor (Sorry!, Pride & Prejudice, War Horse), cancer.
John Kinsella, 89, Irish composer.
Richard Kyanka, 45, American blogger, founder of Something Awful, suicide.
Memo Luna, 91, Mexican baseball player (Tijuana Potros, San Diego Padres, St. Louis Cardinals).
Amkat Mai, 59, Papua New Guinean politician, MP (2012–2013, since 2015).
Lloyd McCuiston, 103, American politician, member (1961–1994) and speaker (1981–1983) of the Arkansas House of Representatives.
Koneru Ramakrishna Rao, 89, Indian psychologist.
Iris Rezende, 87, Brazilian politician, minister of agriculture (1986–1990), governor of Goiás (1983–1986, 1991–1994), and senator (1995–2003), complications from a stroke.
Aldo Rizzo, 86, Italian politician and magistrate, deputy (1979–1992) and mayor of Palermo (1992).
Ethel Grodzins Romm, 96, American author, journalist, and businesswoman.
Herbert Salcher, 92, Austrian politician, minister of finance (1981–1984) and MP (1983).
Jakucho Setouchi, 99, Japanese Buddhist nun and writer, heart failure.
Laurie Sheffield, 82, Welsh footballer (Newport County, Doncaster Rovers, Luton Town).
Duane Wilson, 87, American baseball player (Boston Red Sox).

10
Syed Iftikhar Bokhari, 86, Pakistani cricketer (Punjab, Lahore) and politician, senator (1988–1991).
Delma Cowart, 80, American racing driver.
Clyde Emrich, 90, American Olympic weightlifter (1952) and football coach (Chicago Bears).
Spike Heatley, 88, British jazz double bassist.
Jun Hong Lu, 62, Chinese-born Australian religious leader.
Ed Lucas, 82, American sportswriter (New York Yankees).
Håkon Øverby, 79, Norwegian Olympic wrestler (1968, 1972).
Otto Pendl, 70, Austrian politician, MP (1998–2017).
Farouq Qasrawi, 79, Jordanian politician, minister of foreign affairs (2005).
Ignatius Shixwameni, 55, Namibian politician, MP (since 1999).
Gerald Sinstadt, 91, British television sports commentator and presenter (Granada Television).
Gazbia Sirry, 96, Egyptian painter.
Miroslav Žbirka, 69, Slovak singer and songwriter (Modus), pneumonia.

11
Germain Belzile, 63–64, American economist.
Marcel Bérard, 88, Canadian politician, Quebec MNA (1973–1976).
Per Aage Brandt, 77, Danish writer, linguist, and musician.
Aleksander Ciążyński, 76, Polish Olympic field hockey player (1972).
F. W. de Klerk, 85, South African politician, state president (1989–1994) and deputy president (1994–1996), Nobel Peace Prize laureate (1993), mesothelioma.
Glen de Vries, 49, American businessman and space tourist (Blue Origin NS-18), plane crash.
Graeme Edge, 80, English Hall of Fame drummer (The Moody Blues), songwriter and poet, cancer.
Carl von Essen, 81, Swedish fencer, Olympic champion (1976).
Harris W. Fawell, 92, American politician, member of the Illinois Senate (1963–1977) and the U.S. House of Representatives (1985–1999), complications from Alzheimer's disease.
Mark Gillespie, Australian singer-songwriter.
John Goodsall, 68, American-British rock guitarist (Atomic Rooster, Brand X).
Agus Hamdani, 51, Indonesian politician, regent of Garut (2013–2014).
João Isidório, 29, Brazilian singer and politician, Bahia MLA (since 2019), drowned.
Hilmar Kopper, 86, German banker, chairman of Deutsche Bank (1989–1997).
Jay Last, 92, American physicist.
Lee Ying-yuan, 68, Taiwanese politician, member of the Legislative Yuan (1996–2000, 2012–2016), carcinoma of the ampulla of Vater.
Cristiana Lôbo, 64, Brazilian journalist (GloboNews), multiple myeloma.
Lee Maracle, 71, Canadian First Nations writer (Ravensong), activist and academic.
Aga Mikolaj, 50, Polish operatic soprano, COVID-19.
Bernard Morel, 75, French economist, academic, and politician, vice-president of the Regional Council of Provence-Alpes-Côte d'Azur (since 2012).
Joseph Wilson Morris, 99, American attorney and jurist, judge (1974–1978) and chief judge (1975–1978) of the U.S. District Court for Eastern Oklahoma.
Dino Pedriali, 71, Italian photographer.
Edward L. Sadowsky, 92, American politician, member of the New York City Council (1962–1985).
Sergei Shulgin, 65, Russian politician, deputy (1994–1995).
Art Stewart, 94, American baseball scout.
Mario Tosi, 79, Italian-born American painter and cinematographer (Carrie, The Stunt Man, Sybil).
Elfrida von Nardroff, 96, American game show fraudster (Twenty-One).
Phyllis Webb, 94, Canadian poet and radio broadcaster.
Winter, 16, American dolphin with a prosthetic tail, subject of Dolphin Tale.
Henry Woolf, 91, British actor (The Bed Sitting Room, The Rocky Horror Picture Show, Gorky Park).

12
Bob Bondurant, 88, American Hall of Fame racing driver (Formula One) and instructor.
Ramuntxo Camblong, 82, French politician, president of the Basque Nationalist Party (2004–2008).
Yevgeniy Chazov, 92, Russian physician, minister of health (1987–1990).
Lothar Claesges, 79, German cyclist, Olympic champion (1964).
Humphrey T. Davies, 74, British translator.
Stephen H. Davis, 82, American mathematician.
Matthew Festing, 71, English Roman Catholic official, Prince and Grand Master of the Sovereign Military Order of Malta (2008–2017).
Ron Flowers, 87, English footballer (Wolverhampton Wanderers, Northampton Town, national team), world champion (1966).
Jim Fouras, 83, Greek-born Australian politician, member (1977–1986, 1989–2006) and speaker (1990–1996) of the Legislative Assembly of Queensland, heart attack.
Gian Piero Galeazzi, 75, Italian competition rower, sports journalist, and television personality (90º minuto, Domenica in), complications from diabetes.
Paul Gludovatz, 75, Austrian football manager (SV Ried, TSV Hartberg), COVID-19.
Dave Hickey, 82, American art critic.
Sir Ted Horlick, 96, British Navy vice admiral.
Wasfi Kabha, 62, Palestinian politician, minister of prisoners' affairs (2006–2007) and state (2007), COVID-19. (death announced on this date)
Jusuf Serang Kasim, 77, Indonesian politician, mayor of Tarakan (1999–2009).
Bashir Momin Kavathekar, 74, Indian poet and writer.
Takeshi Koba, 85, Japanese baseball player (Hiroshima Carp, Nankai Hawks).
Viktor Koklyushkin, 75, Russian satirist and television host.
Hugh Leatherman, 90, American politician, member (since 1981) and president pro tempore (2014–2019) of the South Carolina Senate, cancer.
Aleksandr Lenyov, 77, Russian footballer (Torpedo Moscow, Torpedo Kutaisi, Soviet Union national team).
Bill Reichart, 86, Canadian-born American Olympic ice hockey player (1964).
Rock Hard Ten, 20, American racehorse and sire.
Leopold Sánchez, 73, Spanish artist.
Miloš Šibul, 44, Serbian politician, member of the Assembly of Vojvodina (2012–2016).
Mikhail Sobolev, 84, Russian diplomat, ambassador to Guyana and Trinidad and Tobago (1989–1995).
Jörn Svensson, 85, Danish-born Swedish politician, MP (1971–1988), MEP (1995–1999).
John Toye, 79, British economist.
Wilf Wedmann, 73, German-born Canadian Olympic high jumper (1968).
Lakshman Wijesekara, 73, Sri Lankan actor, singer and composer (Miss Jenis).
Abd-al-Hafid Mahmud al-Zulaytini, 83, Libyan banker, governor of the Central Bank of Libya (1990–1996, 2011).

13
Hadiya Khalaf Abbas, 63, Syrian politician, speaker of the People's Assembly (2016–2017), heart attack.
Sohail Asghar, 67, Pakistani actor (Laag).
Louis Bimpson, 92, English footballer (Liverpool, Blackburn Rovers, Rochdale).
Sir Alexander Boswell, 93, British Army officer, lieutenant governor of Guernsey (1985–1990).
Ed Bullins, 86, American playwright (Goin' a Buffalo), complications from dementia.
Michael Corballis, 85, New Zealand psychologist and author.
Frank Drew, 91, American brigadier general.
Dragoș Petre Dumitriu, 57, Romanian journalist and politician, deputy (2004–2008), post-COVID-19 heart attack.
David Fox, 80, Canadian actor (Mama, Grey Owl, X-Men), cancer.
Grigori Galitsin, 64, Russian erotic photographer.
Ivo Georgiev, 49, Bulgarian footballer (Debrecen, Korabostroitel, national team), heart failure.
Gilbert Harman, 83, American philosopher.
Sam Huff, 87, American Hall of Fame football player (New York Giants, Washington Redskins) and commentator.
Jack Kiddey, 92, New Zealand cricketer (Canterbury).
Lidia Lupu, 68, Moldovan economist and politician, deputy (2014–2019).
Keith Mann, 89, New Zealand fencer and sports administrator.
Philip Margo, 79, American musician (The Tokens).
Petra Mayer, 46, American book review editor (NPR), pulmonary embolism.
Ernie Michie, 88, Scottish rugby union player (Leicester Tigers, British & Irish Lions, national team).
John Edwin Midwinter, 83, British electrical engineer and academic.
Jarosław Pacoń, 49, Polish footballer (Stal Stalowa Wola).
John Pearson, 91, British author (The Life of Ian Fleming, James Bond: The Authorized Biography of 007).
Anatoliy Saulevych, 62, Ukrainian footballer (Karpaty Lviv, SKA Lviv, FC Bălți).
Wilbur Smith, 88, Zambian-born South African novelist (When the Lion Feeds, The Courtney Novels, The Ballantyne Novels).
Milind Teltumbde, Indian guerrilla, shot.
Yūji Tokizaki, 81, Japanese politician, member of the House of Representatives (1990–1993).
Bruno Vella, 88, Italian politician, president of the Province of Rieti (1975–1982), mayor of Rieti (1982–1983), and senator (1983–1992).
Emi Wada, 84, Japanese costume designer (Ran, Hero, House of Flying Daggers), Oscar winner (1986).
William Wright, 69, American-born Australian Roman Catholic prelate, bishop of Maitland-Newcastle (2011–2021), lung cancer.

14
Etel Adnan, 96, Lebanese-American poet, novelist (Sitt Marie Rose), and visual artist.
Emmanuel Quaye Archampong, 88, Ghanaian surgeon and academic.
Bertie Auld, 83, Scottish football player (Celtic, national team) and manager (Partick Thistle), complications from dementia.
Bart the Bear 2, 21, American Kodiak bear actor (Into the Wild, We Bought a Zoo, Pete's Dragon).
László Z. Bitó, 87, Hungarian physiologist and writer.
W. Sterling Cary, 94, American Christian minister, president of the National Council of Churches (1972–1975).
Jorge Cervós-Navarro, 91, Spanish pathologist.
Bobby Clark, 77, American actor (Casey Jones, Invasion of the Body Snatchers, Ransom!).
Sani Dangote, 61, Nigerian businessman, vice-president of the Dangote Group.
Alex D. Dickson, 95, American Anglican prelate, bishop of West Tennessee (1983–1994).
Heath Freeman, 41, American actor (Raising the Bar, Bones, Skateland).
Simon Khaya-Moyo, 76, Zimbabwean diplomat and politician, ambassador to South Africa (2007–2011), chairman of ZANU–PF (2011–2014), and minister of media, information and broadcasting services (2017–2018), cancer.
Tore Lindholt, 80, Norwegian economist and politician, director of the Government Pension Fund (1990–2004).
Virginio Pizzali, 86, Italian racing cyclist, Olympic champion (1956).
Somkiat Pongpaiboon, 71, Thai politician, deputy (2007–2011) and co-founder of the Mass Party, cerebral hemorrhage.
Thomas Porteous, 74, American jurist, judge of the U.S. District Court for Eastern Louisiana (1994–2010).
Pierre Reid, 73, Canadian politician, Quebec MNA (2003–2018) and minister of education (2003–2005).
Georgiy Roedov, 82, Russian diplomat, ambassador to Laos (1990–1993) and Kyrgyzstan (1997–2002).
Rašid Šemšedinović, 80, Serbian Olympic ice hockey player (1964).
Gamini Susiriwardana, 58, Sri Lankan singer and actor (Sirasa Superstar, Mago Digo Dai), cancer.
Satya Vrat Shastri, 91, Indian Sanskrit scholar.
Chanmyr Udumbara, 73, Russian intelligence officer and politician, senator (2001–2002).
Marek Vokáč, 62, Czech chess grandmaster.
Vladimir Zhutenkov, 59, Russian businessman and politician, deputy (2016–2017).

15
Dzifa Attivor, 65, Ghanaian politician, minister of transport (2013–2015).
Yasser Al-Awadi, 43, Yemeni politician, member of the House of Representatives (since 2003), heart attack.
Heber Bartolome, 73, Filipino folk singer.
Mannu Bhandari, 90, Indian writer.
Katarina Blagojević, 78, Serbian chess player.
Tony Buck, 84, British Olympic wrestler (1964).
Werner Burger, 85, German numismatist.
Giovanni Colonnelli, 70, Italian footballer (Parma, Reggiana).
Valeriy Dolinin, 68, Russian rower, Olympic silver medallist (1980).
Clarissa Eden, Countess of Avon, 101, British memoirist, spouse of the prime minister (1955–1957).
Estrella Blanca, 83, Mexican professional wrestler (EMLL).
Oldřich Hamera, 77, Czech artist.
Larry J. Hopkins, 88, American politician, member of the U.S. House of Representatives (1979–1993).
Hasan Azizul Huq, 82, Bangladeshi novelist (Agunpakhi).
Jerry Johnson, 77, American baseball player (Philadelphia Phillies, San Francisco Giants, San Diego Padres), Lewy body dementia and COPD.
Bernard Judge, 90, American architect.
Julio Lugo, 45, Dominican baseball player (Houston Astros, Tampa Bay Devil Rays, Boston Red Sox), World Series champion (2007), heart attack.
Bengt Madsen, 79, Swedish football executive (Malmö), cancer.
Osman Öcalan, 63, Turkish militant and political activist, commander of the PKK, COVID-19.
Roger Phillips, 88, British botanist and writer.
Jason Plummer, 52, Australian Olympic swimmer (1988).
Babasaheb Purandare, 99, Indian writer, historian and theatre personality, pneumonia.
Alamin Mohammed Seid, 74, Eritrean politician, minister of information (1993–1996).
Daulet Sembaev, 86, Kazakhstani politician and banker, first deputy prime minister (1992–1993), chairman of the National Bank (1993–1996), and senator (1996–1997).
Sir Rod Weir, 94, New Zealand businessman.

16
Brian Clark, 89, British playwright (Whose Life Is It Anyway?) and screenwriter, aortic aneurysm.
Bobby Collins, 88, American football coach (Southern Miss Golden Eagles, SMU Mustangs).
Ferenc Czvikovszki, 89, Hungarian Olympic fencer (1960).
Tony Dron, 75, British motor racing driver and writer, complications from COPD.
Kamil Durczok, 53, Polish journalist.
Jim Fenwick, 87, Australian photojournalist.
David Frank, 63, Kenyan-born British media executive, co-founder of RDF Media. (death announced on this date)
Drew Gibbs, 59, American football coach (Kean Cougars), complications from surgery.
Md. Akabbar Hossain, 65, Bangladeshi politician, MP (since 2001).
Stephen Holgate, 49, English rugby league player (Workington Town, Wigan Warriors, national team).
Sezai Karakoç, 88, Turkish writer and philosopher.
Jyrki Kasvi, 57, Finnish politician, MP (2003–2011, 2015–2019), cancer.
Alexander Losyukov, 78, Russian diplomat, ambassador to New Zealand (1992–1993), Australia (1993–1997), and Japan (2004–2006).
John Luxton, 75, New Zealand politician, MP (1987–2002).
Renate Mann, 68, Austrian politician, member of the Landtag of Upper Austria (2008–2009).
E. J. Miller Laino, 73, American poet.
Shakeel ur Rahman, 52, Pakistani jurist, judge of the Lahore High Court (since 2018), cancer.
Ri Yong-suk, 105, North Korean revolutionary and politician, deputy (1998–2009). (death announced on this date)
Nadrian Seeman, 75, American nanotechnologist and crystallographer.
Mieczysław Szostek, 88, Polish politician, deputy (1985–1989).

17
Abdul Ghafar Atan, 65, Malaysian politician, Malacca State MLA (2004–2021), COVID-19.
Afsaruddin Ahmad, 81, Bangladeshi politician, MP (1996–2001).
Leonid Bartenyev, 88, Ukrainian sprinter and coach, Olympic silver medalist (1956, 1960).
John Vernon Bartlett, 94, British civil engineer (Channel Tunnel, Victoria line).
Gene Carter, 86, American lawyer and jurist, judge (since 1983) and chief judge (1989–1996) of the U.S. District Court for Maine.
Tom Colley, 68, Canadian ice hockey player (Minnesota North Stars).
Ken Colvin, 82, Australian footballer (South Melbourne), COVID-19.
Igor Denisov, 80, Russian physician and politician, Soviet minister of health (1990–1991).
Gilbert Dragon, 52, Haitian police chief and guerilla commander, suspect in the assassination of Jovenel Moïse, complications from COVID-19.
Jimmie Durham, 81, American sculptor and poet.
Dave Frishberg, 88, American jazz pianist and songwriter ("I'm Just a Bill").
Jacques Hamelink, 82, Dutch poet, novelist, and literary critic.
Karel Havlík, 77, Czech politician, minister without portfolio (1990).
Theuns Jordaan, 50, South African singer-songwriter, leukaemia.
Reg Kent, 77, Australian footballer (Footscray).
Teresa Kodelska, 92, Polish Olympic alpine skier (1952).
Art LaFleur, 78, American actor (Field of Dreams, The Sandlot, The Santa Clause 2), Parkinson's disease.
Christine Laszar, 89, German actress (Geschwader Fledermaus, Before the Lightning Strikes, For Eyes Only).
Antonio Leal Labrín, 71, Chilean politician, member (1998–2010) and president (2006–2007) of the Chamber of Deputies.
R. N. R. Manohar, Indian film director (Maasilamani, Vellore Maavattam) and actor (Sutta Pazham), COVID-19.
Arsenio Moreno Mendoza, 68, Spanish academic, writer, and politician, mayor of Úbeda (1983–1989).
Max Olding, 92, Australian pianist and teacher.
Zuhair Ramadan, 62, Syrian actor, pneumonia.
Stu Rasmussen, 73, American politician, mayor of Silverton, Oregon (2009–2015), prostate cancer.
Igor Savochkin, 58, Russian actor (Night Watch, Admiral, Leviathan) and television presenter.
Mohsen Mojtahed Shabestari, 84, Iranian Shiite cleric and politician, MP (1980–1988, 1992–2000), member of the Assembly of Experts (since 1983), cardiac arrest.
Max Sopacua, 75, Indonesian politician and sportscaster (TVRI), MP (2004–2014).
Tom Stoddart, 68, British photographer, cancer.
Levan Tsutskiridze, 95, Georgian monumentalist artist, illustrator, and painter.
Young Dolph, 36, American rapper, shot.

18
Latif al-Ani, 89, Iraqi photographer.
Peter Buck, 90, American restaurateur, co-founder of Subway.
George Eogan, 91, Irish archaeologist.
Geoffrey Giudice, 73, Australian jurist, judge of the Federal Court (1997–2012).
Richard Goldbloom, 96, Canadian pediatrician and academic, chancellor of Dalhousie University (2001–2008).
Slide Hampton, 89, American jazz trombonist.
Jørgen Haugen Sørensen, 87, Danish sculptor.
Novy Kapadia, 68, Indian football journalist, motor neuron disease.
Al Noor Kassum, 97, Tanzanian politician, MP.
Ali Haydar Kaytan, 69, Turkish militant, co-founder of the PKK, shot.
Paul Kehinde, 33, Nigerian powerlifter, Paralympic champion (2016), 65kg world record-holder (since 2016).
İmran Kılıç, 64, Turkish politician, MP (since 2015), COVID-19.
Dzyanis Kowba, 42, Belarusian footballer (Lokomotiv Vitebsk, Krylia Sovetov Samara, national team), COVID-19.
Joe Laidlaw, 71, English footballer (Middlesbrough, Carlisle United, Doncaster Rovers).
Fabiola Letelier, 92, Chilean lawyer (assassination of Orlando Letelier) and human rights activist, stroke.
Leif Terje Løddesøl, 86, Norwegian banker, CEO of Den norske Creditbank (1980–1988) and Statoil (1996–2003).
Kovi Manisekaran, 94, Indian scholar, film director and actor.
Levy Mkandawire, 60, Zambian politician, traffic collision.
Frank R. Pfetsch, 85, German political scientist.
Sue Picus, 73, American contract bridge player.
Ragnhild Pohanka, 89, Swedish politician, spokesperson of the Green Party (1984–1986) and MP (1988–1991, 1994–1998).
Lori-Jane Powell, 50, Canadian racquetball player, heart attack.
Mick Rock, 72, British photographer.
Ack van Rooyen, 91, Dutch jazz trumpeter and flugelhornist.
William Evan Sanders, 101, American Episcopalian prelate, bishop of East Tennessee (1985–1992).
Kim Suominen, 52, Finnish football player (Turun Palloseura, IFK Norrköping, national team) 
John Taylor, 89, Scottish Episcopal prelate, bishop of Glasgow and Galloway (1991–1996).
Zenon Trzonkowski, 64, Polish football player (Śląsk Wrocław, Zagłębie Lubin) and manager (Odra Opole).
María Elsa Viteri, 56, Ecuadorian economist, minister of finance (2008–2010) and of economy and finance (2018), pancreatic cancer.
Ardeshir Zahedi, 93, Iranian politician and diplomat, minister of foreign affairs (1966–1971), ambassador to the U.K. (1962–1966) and U.S. (1960–1962, 1973–1979), COVID-19 and pneumonia.
Zvi Zilker, 88, German-born Israeli politician, mayor of Ashdod (1969–1983, 1989–2008), cancer.

19
Nina Agapova, 95, Russian actress (Seven Old Men and a Girl, The Invisible Man, Forgotten Melody for a Flute).
Abderrahmane Amalou, 83, Moroccan politician, minister of justice (1995–1997).
Enrico Bacher, 80, Italian Olympic ice hockey player (1964).
Julie Belaga, 91, American politician, member of the Connecticut House of Representatives (1977–1987).
Rod Blackburn, 82, American ice hockey player (New Hampshire Wildcats).
Ian Fishback, 42, American army officer and whistleblower.
Costantino Fittante, 87, Italian politician, deputy (1983–1987).
Josée Forest-Niesing, 56, Canadian politician, senator (since 2018), complications from COVID-19.
Hank von Hell, 49, Norwegian singer (Turbonegro) and actor (Cornelis).
Sylvia Kantaris, 85, British-Australian poet.
Sirilal Kodikara, 97, Sri Lankan journalist, novelist and poet.
Don Kojis, 82, American basketball player (Detroit Pistons, San Diego Rockets, Seattle SuperSonics).
Edgardo Labella, 70, Filipino politician, mayor of Cebu City (since 2019).
Ken Moffett, 90, American federal mediator and union official, executive director of the Major League Baseball Players Association (1982–1983).
Guillermo Morón, 95, Venezuelan writer and historian.
Ricky Nelson, 62, American baseball player (Seattle Mariners), complications from COVID-19.
Pivotal, 28, British Thoroughbred racehorse and sire.
Cedric Robinson, 88, British walking guide, Queen's Guide to the Sands (1963–2019).
Bernard Rollin, 78, American philosopher and academic.
Will Ryan, 72, American voice actor (The Land Before Time, The Little Mermaid, An American Tail) and singer, cancer.
György Schöpflin, 81, Hungarian politician, MEP (2004–2019).
John Sewell, 85, English football player (Charlton Athletic, Crystal Palace) and manager (St. Louis Stars), dementia.
Norman Webster, 80, Canadian journalist and editor (The Globe and Mail), complications from Parkinson's disease.
Marie Lovise Widnes, 91, Norwegian poet and politician, MP (1989–1993).

20
Gbenga Aluko, 58, Nigerian politician, senator (1999–2003).
Rudy Croes, 74, Aruban politician, MP (1989–2001), minister of justice (2001–2009).
Diomid, 60, Russian Orthodox prelate, bishop of Anadyr and Chukotka (2000–2008), traffic collision.
Burgess Gardner, 85, American jazz trumpeter.
Valery Garkalin, 67, Russian actor (Katala, Tsar Ivan the Terrible, Shirli-myrli), COVID-19.
Andreas Georgiou, 68, Cypriot politician, MP (1987–1996).
Don Grimes, 84, Australian politician, senator (1974–1987), minister of social security (1983–1984) and community services (1984–1987).
Abdiaziz Mohamud Guled, Somali journalist (Radio Mogadishu), bombing.
Ted Herold, 79, German singer and actor, house fire.
Billy Hinsche, 70, American musician (Dino, Desi & Billy, The Beach Boys), giant cell carcinoma.
Alberto Labarthe, 93, Chilean Olympic sprinter (1948).
Rita Letendre, 93, Canadian painter.
David Longdon, 56, British singer and musician (Big Big Train).
Carlo Maria Mariani, 90, Italian painter.
Ray McLoughlin, 82, Irish rugby union player (Gosforth, Barbarians, national team).
Merima Njegomir, 68, Serbian folk and sevdah singer.
Nobuaki Sekine, 87, Japanese voice actor (.hack//Legend of the Twilight), cerebral infarction.
Toyonoumi Shinji, 56, Japanese sumo wrestler.
Steve Smith, 57, American football player (Los Angeles Raiders, Seattle Seahawks), complications from amyotrophic lateral sclerosis.
Kojo Tsikata, 85, Ghanaian military officer, head of national security and foreign affairs of the PDNC (1982–1995).

21
Asongo Alalaparu, 79, Surinamese traditional leader, granman of the Tiriyó (since 1997), COVID-19.
Ruben Altunyan, 82, Armenian composer and conductor.
Soher Al Bably, 84, Egyptian actress (Madrast Al-Mushaghebeen).
Yul Anderson, 63, American musician.
Gurmeet Bawa, 77, Indian folk singer.
Robert Bly, 94, American poet (Iron John: A Book About Men, The Sibling Society).
Lou Brooks, 77, American graphic artist and cartoonist.
Mary Brown, 86, American politician, member of the Michigan House of Representatives (1977–1994).
Marietta Chudakova, 84, Russian literary critic, historian, and writer, COVID-19.
Gordon Crosse, 83, English composer.
Lou Cutell, 91, American actor (Pee-wee's Big Adventure, Betty White's Off Their Rockers, Honey, I Shrunk the Kids).
Bert de Leon, 74, Filipino television director (Bubble Gang, Eat Bulaga!, Okay Ka, Fairy Ko!).
Antonio Escohotado, 80, Spanish philosopher and writer.
Verawaty Fadjrin, 64, Indonesian badminton player, world champion (1980), lung cancer.
Guy W. Fiske, 97, American businessman, deputy secretary of commerce (1982–1983).
Bakhtiyor Ikhtiyarov, 81, Uzbek actor (Yor-yor, The Seventh Bullet, Shikari).
Vincenzo La Russa, 83, Italian politician, senator (1979–1983, 1994–1996) and deputy (1983–1987).
Marcella LeBeau, 102, American Lakota politician, nurse and World War II veteran, member of the Cheyenne River Sioux Tribal Council (1991–1995).
Ralph Miller, 88, American Olympic alpine skier (1956), cancer.
Leonid Pilunsky, 74, Ukrainian politician, member of the Verkhovna Rada of Crimea (2006–2014), COVID-19.
Scott Robbe, 66, American television and film producer (Seven and a Match, Queer Eye), complications from blood cancer.
Nina Ruslanova, 75, Russian actress (Afonya, Tears Were Falling, Be My Husband), COVID-19 and pneumonia.
Jean-Pierre Schumacher, 97, French monk, survivor of the Tibhirine massacre.
Leane Suniar, 73, Indonesian Olympic archer (1976), colon cancer.
Bengt Waller, 86, Swedish Olympic sailor (1960).
Sherif Zaki, Egyptian-born American pathologist.

22
E. C. Alft, 96, American historian and politician, mayor of Elgin, Illinois (1967–1971).
Miquel Barceló, 73, Spanish science fiction writer and translator.
James M. Bobbitt, 91, American chemist (Bobbitt reaction), traffic collision.
Igor Bugayev, 88, Russian politician.
Paul Burbridge, 89, British Anglican clergyman, dean of Norwich (1983–1995).
Art Clemente, 96, American politician, member of the Washington House of Representatives (1973–1979).
Erhaab, 30, American Thoroughbred racehorse.
Aldo Falivena, 93, Italian journalist.
Kim Friele, 86, Norwegian LGBT rights activist.
Fayez Ghosn, 71, Lebanese politician, minister of defense (2011–2014).
Margaret Giannini, 100, American physician and medical researcher.
Noah Gordon, 95, American novelist (The Physician).
Doug Hill, 71, American meteorologist (WUSA, WJLA-TV).
Bernard Holley, 81, British actor (Z-Cars, Doctor Who).
Susan V. John, 64, American politician, member of the New York State Assembly (1991–2010), cancer.
Doug Jones, 64, American baseball player (Milwaukee Brewers, Cleveland Indians, Oakland Athletics), COVID-19.
Kim Young-jung, 92, South Korean politician, MP (1985–1988).
Mimi Kyprianou, 89, Cypriot first lady (1977–1988).
Volker Lechtenbrink, 77, German actor (Iron Gustav, Der Hausgeist, By Way of the Stars) and singer.
Ryo Mabuchi, 88, Japanese Olympic diver (1956, 1960), emphysema.
Doug MacLeod, 62, Australian author and screenwriter (The Comedy Company, Dogstar, Full Frontal).
Stuart Macintyre, 74, Australian historian.
Omar Malavé, 58, Venezuelan baseball manager (Dunedin Blue Jays, Algodoneros de Unión Laguna).
Pa Nderry Mbai, Gambian-American journalist.
Hilda Múdra, 95, Austrian-born Slovak figure skating coach.
Paolo Pietrangeli, 76, Italian singer-songwriter, film director (Pigs Have Wings) and screenwriter.
Ned Rea, 77, Irish hurler (Faughs, Limerick).
Hiroichi Sakai, 92, Japanese politician, member of the House of Representatives (1969–1993).
Joanne Shenandoah, 64, American Oneida Indian singer and composer.
Babette Smith, 79, Australian historian.
William L. Stearman, 99, American foreign service officer. (death announced on this date)
Asya Sultanova, 98, Azerbaijani composer.
Baba Suwe, 63, Nigerian actor and comedian.
Marie Versini, 81, French actress (A Holiday with Piroschka, The Brides of Fu Manchu, Is Paris Burning?).
Sylvia Weinstock, 91, American baker.

23
Barrie Aitchison, 84, English footballer (Tottenham Hotspur, Colchester United, Cambridge City).
Janet Campbell Hale, 75, Native American writer and teacher, complications from COVID-19.
Tatyana Chudova, 77, Russian composer.
Chun Doo-hwan, 90, South Korean military officer and politician, president (1980–1988), multiple myeloma.
Mary Collinson, 69, Maltese-British model (Playboy) and actress (Twins of Evil), bronchopneumonia.
Robert Ellis, 92, British-born New Zealand artist.
Bob Essery, 91, British railway modeller and historian.
Nikolai Golyushev, 91, Russian opera singer.
Marko Grilc, 38, Slovenian snowboarder, accidental head trauma.
Hasan Fehmi Güneş, 87, Turkish politician, minister of interior (1979).
Miran Györek, 69, Slovenian politician, MP (2008–2011).
Amman Jalmaani, 72, Filipino Olympic swimmer (1964, 1968, 1972).
Jan Kawulok, 75, Polish Olympic skier (1968).
Simon Kistemaker, 80, Dutch football manager (Drechtsteden '79, De Graafschap, SC Telstar).
Bjørn Larsson, 97, Norwegian Olympic wrestler (1952).
Sadhu Charan Mahato, 48, Indian politician, Jharkhand MLA (2014–2019), throat cancer.
Sir James Fitz-Allen Mitchell, 90, Vincentian politician, premier (1972–1974) and prime minister (1984–2000).
Riuler, 23, Brazilian footballer (J.FC Miyazaki, Shonan Bellmare), heart attack.
Hans Rosendahl, 76, Swedish Olympic swimmer (1964).
Romuald Schild, 85, Polish archaeologist.
Teata Semiz, 87, American Hall of Fame bowler, complications of broken hip.
Don Shondell, 92, American volleyball coach.
Melvin Tinker, 66, British clergyman, pancreatic cancer.
Rosalie Trombley, 82, Canadian music director (CKLW).
Andrew Vachss, 79, American crime fiction author (Strega, Batman: The Ultimate Evil) and attorney.
Bill Virdon, 90, American baseball player (St. Louis Cardinals, Pittsburgh Pirates) and manager (Houston Astros), World Series champion (1960, 1971).
Allin Vlasenko, 83, Ukrainian conductor.

24
Aron Atabek, 68, Kazakhstani writer, poet and dissident, COVID-19.
Hermann Bausinger, 95, German cultural scientist.
Mārtiņš Brauns, 70, Latvian composer ("Saule, Pērkons, Daugava"), COVID-19.
Lisa Brown, 67, American actress (As the World Turns, Guiding Light).
Frank Burrows, 77, Scottish football player (Swindon Town, Scunthorpe United) and manager (Portsmouth).
Ian Curteis, 86, British dramatist (The Falklands Play).
Luis Díaz, 76, Colombian Olympic cyclist (1972), cancer.
Ennio Doris, 81, Italian banker, founder of Banca Mediolanum.
Guillermo Echevarría, 73, Mexican Olympic swimmer (1964, 1968).
U. L. Gooch, 98, American aviator and politician, member of the Kansas Senate (1993–2004).
Wiesław Hartman, 71, Polish show jumping equestrian, Olympic silver medallist (1980).
Cliff Marshall, 66, English footballer (Miami Toros, Southport, Everton).
Marilyn McLeod, 82, American singer-songwriter ("Love Hangover", "You Can't Turn Me Off (In the Middle of Turning Me On)").
Keith Morton, 87, English footballer (Darlington).
Raif Nagm, 94–95, Jordanian civil engineer and politician, minister of public works and housing (1984–1985).
Aryeh Nehemkin, 96, Israeli politician, member of the Knesset (1981–1988) and minister of agriculture (1984–1988).
Daniel L. Overmyer, 86, Canadian academic, cancer.
Musafir Paswan, 66, Indian politician, Bihar MLA (since 2020).
Jeannette Ramos, 89, Puerto Rican judge, first lady (1967–1969).
Betty Jean Robinson, 88, American singer.
Ivan Stanchov, 92, Bulgarian diplomat and politician, ambassador to the U.K. (1991–1994) and minister of foreign affairs (1994–1995).
Jim Warren, 85, American computer scientist, co-founder of the West Coast Computer Faire and Dr. Dobb's Journal.
Yvonne Wilder, 84, American actress (West Side Story, Seems Like Old Times, Full House).

25
Theodorus Dekker, 94, Dutch mathematician.
Carol Gould, 68, American writer and broadcaster.
John Hall, 88, American businessman, chairman and CEO of Ashland Oil Inc. (1981–1997).
Dieter B. Herrmann, 82, German astronomer.
Galal Ibrahim, Egyptian football executive, president of Zamalek (1992–1996, 2010–2011).
Risto Kala, 80, Finnish Olympic basketball player (1964).
Peter Kanis, 90, Australian footballer (Hawthorn).
Julien Le Bas, 97, French Olympic sprinter (1948).
Justin Lekoundzou, 80, Congolese politician, minister of finance (1983–1987) and MP (1992–1993, 2002–2012).
Bohdan Levkiv, 71, Ukrainian politician, mayor of Ternopil (2002–2006).
Charles Moose, 68, American author and police officer (D.C. sniper attacks), chief of the Montgomery County Police Department (1999–2003).
Peeter Olesk, 67, Estonian literary scholar and politician, minister of population and ethnic affairs (1993–1994) and culture (1994–1995).
Oleksandr Omelchenko, 83, Ukrainian politician, mayor of Kyiv (1999–2006) and deputy (2007–2012), COVID-19.
Don Phillips, 80, American casting director (Dog Day Afternoon, Fast Times at Ridgemont High) and producer (Melvin and Howard).
Abani Roy, 82, Indian politician, MP (1998–2011).
Anne Rudin, 97, American politician, mayor of Sacramento (1983–1992), pneumonia.
Numan al-Samarrai, 86, Iraqi Muslim scholar and politician, secretary-general of the Iraqi Islamic Party (1960).
Sananta Tanty, 69, Indian Assamese poet.
Augusto Zweifel, 100, Italian footballer (Novara) and tennis player.

26
Norman Allen, 93, Irish hurler and Gaelic footballer (St Vincents).
Mohan Bhandari, 84, Indian writer.
Óscar Catacora, 34, Peruvian film director, screenwriter, and cinematographer (Eternity), appendicitis.
Siobhan Cattigan, 26, Scottish rugby union player (Stirling County, national team).
Doug Cowie, 95, Scottish footballer (Dundee, Greenock Morton, national team).
Keith De Lacy, 81, Australian politician, Queensland MLA (1983–1998) and treasurer (1989–1996), cancer.
Michael Fisher, 90, English physicist.
Roger Fritz, 85, German actor (Cross of Iron) and film director, stroke.
Buster Guzzardo, 98, American politician, member of the Louisiana House of Representatives (1987–1996).
Hamdi Hassan, 65, Egyptian politician, MP (2005–2010).
Kwon Jung-dong, 89, South Korean politician, minister of labor (1980–1982) and MP (1985–1988).
Ruslan Mostovyi, 47, Ukrainian football player (Avanhard Zhydachiv, Spartak Nalchik) and manager (Prykarpattia Ivano-Frankivsk), traffic collision.
Nguyễn Hồng Nhị, 84, Vietnamese fighter pilot (VPAF).
Mark Roth, 70, American bowler, pneumonia.
Stephen Sondheim, 91, American composer and lyricist (West Side Story, Company, Sweeney Todd: The Demon Barber of Fleet Street), nine-time Tony winner, cardiovascular disease.
Bichu Thirumala, 80, Indian lyricist (Thrishna, Krishnagudiyil Oru Pranayakalathu, Kadinjool Kalyanam) and poet, heart attack.
Aleksandr Timoshinin, 73, Russian rower, Olympic champion (1968, 1972).
German Zonin, 95, Russian football player (Dynamo Leningrad) and manager (Myanmar national team, Soviet Union national team).

27
Adolfo, 98, Cuban-born American fashion designer.
Apetor, 57, Norwegian YouTuber, drowned.
Tony Ayres, 54, English darts player.
Donald Caspar, 94, American structural biologist.
Jacques Cinq-Mars, 79, Canadian archaeologist.
Curley Culp, 75, American Hall of Fame football player (Kansas City Chiefs, Houston Oilers, Detroit Lions), Super Bowl champion (1970), complications from pancreatic cancer.
Beverley Dunn, 88, Australian actress (The Flying Doctors, Prisoner, Dogstar).
Almudena Grandes, 61, Spanish writer, cancer.
Teppo Hauta-aho, 80, Finnish double bassist.
Gregory J. Hobbs Jr., 76, American jurist, associate justice on the Colorado Supreme Court (1996–2015).
Matti Keinonen, 80, Finnish Hall of Fame ice hockey player (Lukko, HJK, national team), cancer.
Ken Lyotier, 74, Canadian social worker.
Lubomyra Mandziy, 48, Ukrainian educator and civil servant, acting minister of education and science (2020).
Shirley McBay, 86, American mathematician and activist.
Ed McClanahan, 89, American novelist and essayist.
Eddie Mekka, 69, American actor (Laverne & Shirley, Blansky's Beauties, Top of the World).
Milutin Mrkonjić, 79, Serbian politician, minister of infrastructure, energy and transportation (2008–2013).
Jimmy O'Dea, 86, Irish-born New Zealand trade unionist and activist.
Ruy Ohtake, 83, Brazilian architect, myelodysplastic syndrome.
Park Jong-soo, 80, South Korean taekwondo practitioner, original master of taekwondo.
Francis Routh, 94, British composer and author.
Giampaolo Tronchin, 80, Italian Olympic rower (1972).
Monique Vinh Thuy, 75, French diplomat, princess of Vietnam in-exile.
Colin Young, 94, British film educator, chairman of the UCLA School of Theater, Film and Television.

28
Virgil Abloh, 41, American fashion designer, founder and CEO of Off-White (since 2012), cancer.
Brian Barnes, 77, English artist.
Mustafa Cengiz, 71, Turkish football executive, president of Galatasaray (2018–2021), cancer.
Jacqueline Danno, 90, French actress.
Lee Elder, 87, American golfer.
Paul Lawrence Farber, 77, American science historian.
August von Finck Jr., 91, German businessman.
Justo Gallego Martínez, 96, Spanish monk and builder.
Alexander Gradsky, 72, Russian rock singer, musician, and composer, stroke.
Laila Halme, 87, Finnish singer ("Muistojeni laulu").
Doyle Hamm, 64, American convicted murderer and botched execution survivor, cancer.
Chuck Hazama, 89, American politician, mayor of Rochester, Minnesota (1979–1995).
Johnny Hills, 87, English footballer (Tottenham Hotspur, Bristol Rovers).
C. J. Hunter, 52, American Olympic shot putter (1996) and coach, world champion (1999).
Lalthlamuong Keivom, 82, Indian writer and diplomat, cancer.
Trevor Kennedy, 79, Australian businessman. (death announced on this date)
Nakamura Kichiemon II, 77, Japanese actor (Kuroneko, Double Suicide, Onihei Hankachō) and kabuki performer, heart failure.
Emmit King, 62, American Olympic sprinter (1984, 1988), shot.
Jean-Paul LeBlanc, 98, Canadian politician, New Brunswick MLA (1970–1974).
Carrie Meek, 95, American politician, member of the Florida House of Representatives (1979–1982) and Senate (1982–1992) and the U.S. House of Representatives (1993–2003).
Meñique, 87, Panamanian singer and songwriter.
Emily Mkamanga, 71, Malawian writer and political commentator.
François Moncla, 89, French rugby union player (Racing 92, Section Paloise, national team).
Norodom Ranariddh, 77, Cambodian politician and law academic, prime minister (1993–1997), member (1998–2006, 2017–2018) and president (1998–2006) of the National Assembly.
Prince Andrew Romanoff, 98, Russian-American aristocrat and writer, disputed head of the House of Romanov (since 2016).
Guillermo Roux, 92, Argentine painter.
Patu Tiava'asu'e Falefatu Sapolu, 71, Samoan judge, chief justice (1992–2019), attorney-general (1988–1991).
Russ Sainty, 85, English pop singer.
Phil Saviano, 69, American children's rights advocate and child abuse whistleblower, gallbladder cancer.
K. Sivasankar, 72, Indian choreographer (Poove Unakkaga, Vishwa Thulasi, Uliyin Osai) and actor, COVID-19.
Anthony Smith, 83, British broadcaster, author and academic, president of Magdalen College, Oxford (1988–2005), renal failure.
Jiří Srnec, 90, Czech theatre director and artist.
Jolene Unsoeld, 89, American politician, member of the Washington (1985–1989) and the U.S. Houses of Representatives (1989–1995).
Herman-Hartmut Weyel, 88, German politician, mayor of Mainz (1987–1997).
Sir Frank Williams, 79, British motor racing team owner and constructor (Williams Racing).

29
Constance Ahrons, 84, American psychotherapist, assisted suicide.
Jagdish Lal Ahuja, 86, Indian social worker, cancer.
Otis Anderson Jr., 23, American football player (UCF Knights), shot.
Kinza Clodumar, 76, Nauruan politician, MP (1971–1979, 1983–1989, 1995–2003) and president (1997–1998).
Arlene Dahl, 96, American actress (Journey to the Center of the Earth, A Southern Yankee, Reign of Terror).
Don Demeter, 86, American baseball player (Los Angeles Dodgers, Philadelphia Phillies, Detroit Tigers).
William Fulco, 85, American Jesuit priest.
Jim Gerhardt, 92, American Olympic triple jumper (1952).
David Gulpilil, 68, Australian actor (Walkabout, Charlie's Country, Crocodile Dundee), lung cancer.
LaMarr Hoyt, 66, American baseball player (Chicago White Sox, San Diego Padres), cancer.
Nurul Islam Jihadi, 73, Bangladeshi Islamic scholar, secretary general of Hefazat-e-Islam Bangladesh (since 2020).
Bruce William Kauffman, 86, American jurist, judge of the U.S. District Court for Eastern Pennsylvania (1997–2009).
Bob Kilger, 77, Canadian politician, MP (1988–2004) and mayor of Cornwall (2006–2014), stomach cancer.
Jack Lemley, 86, American architect and engineering manager (Channel Tunnel).
Frits Louer, 90, Dutch footballer (NOAD, Willem II, national team).
Jake Millar, 26, New Zealand entrepreneur and businessman.
Vladimir Naumov, 93, Russian film director (The Wind, Peace to Him Who Enters, Teheran 43), screenwriter and producer.
Allan Rechtschaffen, 93, American sleep researcher.
Ayako Shirasaki, 52, Japanese-American jazz pianist and composer, cancer.
Robert Farris Thompson, 88, American art historian and writer, Parkinson's disease complicated by COVID-19.
Alexander Zaitsev, 76, Russian astronomer.
Muhammad Ziauddin, 83, Pakistani journalist (Pakistan & Gulf Economist, The News International, The Express Tribune).
Sandor Zicherman, 86, Hungarian artist. (death announced on this date)

30
Sir Max Bingham, 94, Australian politician, deputy premier of Tasmania (1982–1984).
Marie-Claire Blais, 82, Canadian writer (Mad Shadows, A Season in the Life of Emmanuel) and poet.
Oriol Bohigas, 95, Spanish architect (MBM Arquitectes) and urban planner, Barcelona city councilor (1991–1994) and president of Fundació Joan Miró (1981–1988).
H. Jackson Brown Jr., 81, American author.
Albert Bustamante, 86, American judge and politician, member of the U.S. House of Representatives (1985–1993).
Barney Carr, 98, Northern Irish Gaelic footballer (Warrenpoint).
Sirisena Cooray, 90, Sri Lankan politician, mayor of Colombo (1979–1989), MP (1989–1994) and minister of housing (1989–1994).
Chuck Dobson, 77, American baseball player (Oakland Athletics, California Angels).
Dave Draper, 79, American bodybuilder, actor (Lord Love a Duck, Don't Make Waves), and author, heart failure.
Phil Dwyer, 68, Welsh footballer (Cardiff City, national team).
Patrocinio González Garrido, 87, Mexican politician, senator (1982–1988), governor of Chiapas (1988–1993), and secretary of the interior (1993–1994).
Peter Greenwood, 97, English footballer (Chester City) and cricketer (Lancashire).
Janis Hansen, 81, American talent manager and actress (The Odd Couple).
Philip Heymann, 89, American lawyer, deputy attorney general (1993–1994).
Rafiqul Islam, 87, Bangladeshi educationist, president of Bangla Academy (since 2021), chairman of Nazrul Institute (since 2018) and vice-chancellor of JUST (2008–2009).
Ray Kennedy, 70, English footballer (Liverpool, Arsenal, national team), complications from Parkinson's disease.
Pampi Laduche, 66, French Basque pelota player.
Marcus Lamb, 64, American televangelist, founder of Daystar, COVID-19.
Mary Maher, 81, American-born Irish trade unionist, feminist and journalist.
Edison Misla Aldarondo, 79, Puerto Rican politician, member (1977–2002) and speaker (1993–2000) of the House of Representatives.
C. Herbert Oliver, 96, American pastor and civil rights activist.
Jonathan Penrose, 88, English chess player.
Ernesta G. Procope, 98, American investment banker.
Klaus Reinhardt, 80, German military officer.
Charles Revet, 84, French politician, senator (1995–2019).
Klaus Rainer Röhl, 92, German journalist and author.
Kal Rudman, 91, American disc jockey, color commentator and philanthropist, cofounder of the Kal and Lucille Rudman Foundation.
Sirivennela Seetharama Sastry, 66, Indian lyricist (Sirivennela, Swarnakamalam, Nuvvostanante Nenoddantana), lung cancer.
John Sillett, 85, English football player (Chelsea, Coventry City) and manager (Hereford United).
David Smith, 81, English cricketer (Derbyshire, Orange Free State).
Pamela Helen Stephen, 57, British mezzo-soprano, cancer.
Marjorie Tallchief, 95, American ballerina.
Jože Urankar, 82, Slovenian Olympic weightlifter (1972). (death announced on this date)
Joseph Wayas, 80, Nigerian politician, president of the senate (1979–1983).
Erwin Wilczek, 81, Polish football player (Górnik Zabrze, Valenciennes, national team) and manager.
G. Yafit, 70, Israeli advertising executive, cancer.

References

2021-11
11